Mniochloa is a genus of Cuban plants in the grass family. The only known species is Mniochloa pulchella, native to eastern Cuba near Guantánamo.

formerly included
see Piresiella 
Mniochloa strephioides – Piresiella strephioides

References

Bambusoideae genera
Endemic flora of Cuba
Grasses of North America
Monotypic Poaceae genera
Bambusoideae